Valdemar Einar Psilander (9 May 1884 – 6 March 1917) was a Danish silent film actor, who was the highest-paid performer of his period and received critical acclaim as the greatest male lead during the golden era of Danish cinema.

Biography

Early life
Valdemar Psilander was born in Copenhagen, Denmark on 9 May 1884. At the age of 15, he was employed as an apprentice actor at the Casino theater in Copenhagen and performed at both the Frederiksberg and Dagmar Theaters through 1909. His stage performances were not particularly notable.

Film career
Psilander debuted on screen in the fall of 1910 in The Portrait of Dorian Gray for a small film company, Regia Kunst Film. He was immediately hired away by Nordisk Film to perform in  August Blom's Ved Fængslets Port (At the Prison Gates).<ref name="nordisk">[http://www.nordiskfilm.com/Press/Anecdotes/Valdemar+Psilander+a+global+star+from+Nordisk+Film.htm  Valdemar Psilander -- a global star from Nordisk Film]  Nordisk Film Press, April 10, 2006, retrieved 2008-05-27</ref> Psilander's charismatic performance earned him great praise and he quickly became Nordisk's highest-paid actor.  Within two years, he was named the most popular male actor in film magazine readership polls around the world. During the course of the next 6 years, Psilander made 83 films.

In 1911, Nordisk Film had a fine international reputation and a wide distribution network, but it was Psilander's films which spearheaded the company's sales. He was especially popular among German, Russian and Hungarian audiences. He appeared in such films as Evangeliemandens Liv (The Candle and the Moth) directed by Holger-Madsen, and Klovnen directed by A.W. Sandberg, which was released after his death. Psilander's fees peaked in 1915, when he earned an annual salary of 100,000 DKK. (By comparison, the next highest paid star of the era, Olaf Fønss, received 14,000 DKK).

Psilander seldom granted interviews. In a rare newspaper interview from 1913, he spoke about his acting method: "We so often see fine stage actors become nothing on film because they don't understand that it depends upon concentration. The interesting thing about film is that we play to all social classes and in all parts of the world. We must in our means of expression appear nearly primitively genuine, truly original. One can perhaps learn to become an actor but you can never learn to be filmed. Studied emotions on film become artificial and false. Film relentlessly demands truthfulness and sincerity."Valdemar Psilander, Interview, København Avis, March 4, 1913, retrieved [2008-05-27]

Marriage and death
Psilander married the actress Edith Buemann. On 6 March 1917, Psilander was found dead at age 32 in his suite at the Hotel Bristol in Copenhagen. The official cause of death was cardiac arrest. However, rumors circulated that he had committed suicide. He was buried at the Taarbæk Kirkegård.

Selected filmographyThe Portrait of Dorian Gray (Axel Strøm, 1910)The Black Dream (Urban Gad, 1911) as Count Johan WaldbergAt the Prison Gates (August Blom, 1911) as Aage HellertzA Victim of the Mormons (August Blom, 1911) as Andrew Larson, Mormon PriestThe Great Circus Catastrophe (Eduard Schnedler-Sørensen, 1912) as Count Willy von RosenörnLivets Baal (Eduard Schnedler-Sørensen, 1912) as Herbert Jyrtel Professor of ChemistryThe Strike at the Old Factory (Robert Dinesen, 1913) as HansThe Evangelist's Life (Holger-Madsen, 1915) as John Redmond, EvangelistPoison Arrow (August Blom, 1916) as Edmond Vernon, DetectiveThe Clown (A.W. Sandberg, 1917) as The Clown Joe Higgins
 The Secret of the Desert'' (1918)

References

Further reading
Valdemar Psilander -- A World Star in Danish Film by Lisbeth Richter Larsen, (2004)
Valdemar Psilander at Det Danske Filmistitut
Valdemar Psilander -- a global star from Nordisk Film from Nordisk Film Press Release

Danish male film actors
Danish male stage actors
Danish male silent film actors
Male actors from Copenhagen
1884 births
1917 deaths
20th-century Danish male actors